Dickinson College Commentaries  is a digital project of Dickinson College, which is located in Carlisle, near Harrisburg, in the U.S. state of Pennsylvania. The project assembles digital commentaries on texts in Latin and ancient Greek and publishes core vocabularies of the most common words in those languages. It is hosted by the department of Classical Studies.

History 
In 2010 DCC launched a pilot site in MediaWiki that was dedicated to notes on the selections from Gallic Wars used in the American Advanced Placement Latin Exam. The site moved to Drupal in 2012. 
The project director is Christopher Francese, the Asbury J. Clarke Professor of Classical Studies at Dickinson College.

Peer Review 
Commentary proposals are reviewed and edited in a process similar to that used by traditional academic print publishers.

Copyright status 
Dickinson College Commentaries supports open-source content, and publishes all content under a Creative Commons CC-BY-SA license.

External links 
 Dickinson College Commentaries
 Dickinson Classics Online (Chinese sister project)
 Anne Mahoney, “Latin Commentaries on the Web.” Teaching Classical Languages 5.2 (2014): 133–143.

References 

Computing in classical studies
Discipline-oriented digital libraries
Educational projects
Digital humanities
Dickinson College